Winifred Annie Valentine (1886–1968) was a New Zealand teacher and educationalist. She was born in Hawksbury, Otago, New Zealand in 1886. Winifred completed her teacher training in Dunedin. In 1921 she travelled to Canada under a reciprocal arrangement with the Canadian Educational Authority. She was a fighter for the rights to an education for children with special educational needs. She died in Wellington on 6 August 1968.

References

1886 births
1968 deaths
Schoolteachers from Dunedin